Moisant may refer to:
John Bevins Moisant (1868–1910), American aviation pioneer and brother of Matilde
Matilde E. Moisant (1878–1964), American aviation pioneer and sister of John
Moisant Aviation School, an institution founded by John and his brother Alfred, also known as the Moisant Flying School
Moisant's International Aviators, a flying circus hosted by the school
Moisant Field, the original name of Louis Armstrong New Orleans International Airport (also known as Moisant Army Airfield during World War II, and as Moisant Airport)
Jacques Moisant de Brieux (1611–1674), French historian and poet